is a passenger railway station in the city of Shibukawa, Gunma, Japan, operated by the East Japan Railway Company (JR East).

Lines

Station layout
The station has two opposed side platforms connected to the station building by a footbridge. The station is unattended.

Platforms

History
Tsukuda Station opened on 1 October 1943 as a signal stop and was elevated to a full station on 1 January 1948. Upon the privatization of the Japanese National Railways (JNR) on 1 April 1987, it came under the control of JR East. A new station building was completed in March 2003.

Surrounding area
Tone River

See also
 List of railway stations in Japan

External links

 Station information (JR East) 

Railway stations in Gunma Prefecture
Railway stations in Japan opened in 1948
Stations of East Japan Railway Company
Jōetsu Line
Shibukawa, Gunma